Disgrace is a 1999 novel by J. M. Coetzee.

Disgrace may also refer to:

 Disgrace (1929 film), a Czech-German film
 Disgrace (2008 film), an adaptation of the novel

See also 
 Disgraced (disambiguation)